John Sunseri (born March 11, 1969) is a horror writer from Portland, Oregon in the United States. As well as writing traditional horror fiction he also writes Lovecraftian horror. John spent two years at Yale University studying a major in English. Today he manages a restaurant.

Writing since 2001, John has published over 50 short stories. 2007 saw the release of his first novel, The Spiraling Worm co-written with Australian author David Conyers.

Books

The Jack Dixon/Harrison Peel series
Modern day Lovecraftian horror series set in the world of spies and government conspiracies.
 The Spiraling Worm (2007), with David Conyers,

Anthology appearances
 When the Ship Came (2007), Horrors Beyond II, ed. William Jones, Elder Signs Press.
 Not What One Does (2007) with C. J. Henderson, Lai Wan: Tales of the Dreamwalker, ed. William Jones, Marietta Publishing.
 A Little Job in Arkham (2006), Hardboiled Cthulhu, ed. James Ambuehl, Elder Signs Press.
 The Hades Project (2005), Horrors Beyond, ed. William Jones, Elder Signs Press.

Select magazine appearances
 A Business Proposal (2005) Black Petals Autumn Issue
 Household Gods (2005), Bare Bone #7
 A Prayer for the Silent, Bare Bone #8
 Spirits of Earth and Sky (2005), Cthulhu Sex v2 #22
 A Voice Was Heard in Ramah (2005), Black Petals Summer Issue
 Enter the Dragon (2004), Black Petals Summer Issue
 Rag Doll (2004), Bare Bone #5
 To Catch a Ghost (2004), Black Petals Spring Issue

External links
 Official Homepage

1969 births
American horror writers
American science fiction writers
American short story writers
Cthulhu Mythos writers
Living people
Writers from Portland, Oregon
American male novelists
American male short story writers
Novelists from Oregon